Bonnie Doon is a former railway station in Bonnie Doon, Victoria, Australia. The tracks have been removed, but some structures remain at the site of the former station.

References

External links
Victorian Railway Stations - Bonnie Doon

Railway stations in Australia opened in 1891
Railway stations closed in 1978
Disused railway stations in Victoria (Australia)
Mansfield railway line